Lovey Dovey (Lovey Dovey – ) is a 2016 Thai television series starring Chutavuth Pattarakampol (March), Sheranut Yusananda (Namcha), Nichaphat Chatchaipholrat (Pearwah) and Thassapak Hsu (Bie).

Produced by GMMTV, the series is an adaptation of the novels Lovey Brother and Dovey Sister by May 112. It premiered on One31 and LINE TV on 19 June 2016, airing on Sundays at 16:00 ICT and 18:00 ICT, respectively. The series concluded on 4 December 2016.

Cast and characters 
Below are the cast of the series:

Main 
 Chutavuth Pattarakampol (March) as Daoneu
 Sheranut Yusananda (Namcha) as Kookai
 Nichaphat Chatchaipholrat (Pearwah) as Khaiwan
 Thassapak Hsu (Bie) as Kongfa

Supporting 
 Tawan Vihokratana (Tay) as Dew
 Apichaya Saejung (Ciize) as Koi
 Pronpiphat Pattanasettanon (Plustor) as Shang
 Korn Khunatipapisiri (Oaujun) as a young Kongfa
 Ramida Jiranorraphat (Jane) as a young Kookai
 Ingkarat Damrongsakkul (Ryu) as a young Daoneu
 Thanaboon Wanlopsirinun (Na) as News
 Praeploy Oree as Coco

References

External links 
 Lovey Dovey on GMM 25 website 
 Lovey Dovey on LINE TV
 GMMTV

Television series by GMMTV
Thai romantic comedy television series
2016 Thai television series debuts
2016 Thai television series endings
One 31 original programming